The Patrick Ranch House, at 1225 Gordon Ave. in Reno, Nevada, was built c.1901 and has been described as "a charming, turn-of-the-century, Folk Victorian home with Queen Anne attributes."
It was listed on the National Register of Historic Places in 2003. It was deemed significant "for its role in Reno's community planning and development history" and "as an excellent example of Folk Victorian/Queen Anne style of architecture, which is becoming increasingly rare."

References 

Houses on the National Register of Historic Places in Nevada
Queen Anne architecture in Nevada
Houses completed in 1901
National Register of Historic Places in Reno, Nevada
Houses in Reno, Nevada